Lord and Lady Algy is a lost 1919 American silent comedy film directed by Harry Beaumont and starring Tom Moore, Naomi Childers, and Frank Leigh. It is based on a play of the same name by R.C. Carton.

The film's sets were designed by the art director Hugo Ballin.

Plot
As described in a film magazine, Lord Algy (Moore) is addicted to betting, which causes an estrangement with his wife, Lady Algy (Childers). They part under an informal arrangement, although each continues to admire the other. Lord Algy determines to retrench his fortune by backing a certain horse in a race. Lady Algy, knowing the horse cannot win, makes friends with Jethroe (Stuart) to get a tip on the race, hoping to win enough to recoup her husband's losses. Mrs. Tudway (Ballin), wife of a friend of Lord Algy, plans to run away with another man. Algy learns of the plan and cooperates, allowing the elopers the use of his chambers as a rendezvous, hoping to persuade Mrs. Tudway to stay with her husband. Scandal then connects the names of Lady Algy with Jethroe and of Lord Algy with Mrs. Tudway. Algy's horse loses the race while Lady Algy's wins. Brabazon Tudway (Burress) discovers his wife in Lord Algy's chambers and suspects him of stealing her affections. Lady Algy arrives, grasps the situation at a glance, and diplomatically smooths things over. She tells Lord Algy of her success with the race and they are reunited.

Cast
 Tom Moore as Lord Algy 
 Naomi Childers as Lady Algy 
 Leslie Stuart as Jethroe 
 Frank Leigh as Marquis of Quarmby 
 William Burress as Brabazon Tudway
 Alec B. Francis as Swepson 
 Philo McCullough as Standage 
 Mabel Ballin as Mrs. Tudway 
 Kate Lester as Mrs. Vokins 
 Hal Taintor as Annesley 
 Herbert Standing as Undetermined Role 
 Jack Duffy as Undetermined Role

References

Bibliography
 Gmür, Leonhard. Rex Ingram: Hollywood's Rebel of the Silver Screen. Impressum, 2013.

External links

1919 films
1919 comedy films
1910s English-language films
American silent feature films
Silent American comedy films
American films based on plays
Films directed by Harry Beaumont
Films set in England
American black-and-white films
Lost American films
1919 lost films
Lost comedy films
1910s American films